Charles Bakkabulindi (born 25 November 1959),  is a Ugandan politician. Of recent he served as the State Minister for Sports in the Ugandan Cabinet, Hamsom Obua succeeded him. He was appointed to that position in 2005. In the cabinet reshuffles of 1 June 2006, 16 February 2009, that of 27 May 2011, and that of 1 March 2015 he retained his cabinet post. He is also the Member of Parliament representing Workers.

Early life and education
His oldest post-secondary academic qualification is the Diploma in Electrical Engineering, which he obtained in 1985, from the Uganda Polytechnic Kyambogo, one of the constituent institutions of Kyambogo University. He went on to obtain the degree of Bachelor of Arts in Adult and Community Education, obtained in 2006, from Makerere University, Uganda's oldest and largest public university. In 2007, he was awarded the Postgraduate Diploma in Public Administration, from Uganda Management Institute. His degree of Master of Arts in Management Studies was awarded in 2006, also by UMI.

Career
Between 1994 and 1996, he served as a Delegate to the Constituent Assembly that drafted and passed the 1995 Ugandan Constitution. In 1996, he was elected to serve in Uganda's Parliament as the Workers Representative, a position he has served in since. Also in 1996, he was elected the National Chairman of the Uganda Beverage, Tobacco and Allied Worker's Union, a position he still holds today. In 2005, he was appointed State Minister for Sports. He is the incumbent for that cabinet position, as at March 2015.

Bakkabulindi is married. He is reported to enjoy listening to music, reading, following politics and watching sports.

See also
 Cabinet of Uganda
 Parliament of Uganda
 Government of Uganda

References

1959 births
Living people
Makerere University alumni
Ganda people
Kyambogo University alumni
Government ministers of Uganda
Members of the Parliament of Uganda
Uganda Management Institute alumni
21st-century Ugandan politicians